Elderslie is a village in the council area and historic county of Renfrewshire in west central Scotland.

Elderslie is most famous as the assumed birthplace of Scottish hero Sir William Wallace, a knight born around 1270 who served as a military leader in the Wars of Scottish Independence before being captured and executed. There is a monument to him in the village, alongside what is believed to be his home.

History
The origin of the name of "Elderslie" is Old English for "field of Elder Trees".

It is assumed that William Wallace was born and grew up in Elderslie. On the site of the ancient Elderslie Castle there stands a monument to commemorate his life, and a commemoration ceremony is held every August. Also on the site is the Wallace Yew, an ancient yew tree and the Wallace Oak stood nearby until 1856. Auchenbathie Tower a few miles to the south is a site associated with William Wallace in an action against the English.

From 1862 to 2004 the village was the home to Stoddard Carpets which made the carpets for the Cunard liners ,  and Queen Elizabeth 2 which were built by John Brown & Company in their shipyard in Clydebank. The firm also produced carpets for Queen Elizabeth II's wedding in Westminster Abbey, the ocean liner  and for the Concorde aircraft.  A remaining example of the work which was carried out here can be seen in the circular carpet which covers the floor of the drawing room in Culzean Castle designed by Robert Adam.

Elderslie railway station operated on the Glasgow, Paisley, Kilmarnock and Ayr Railway from 1840 to 1966.

Education
There is one non-denominational state primary school in Elderslie: Wallace Primary School, which is a feeder school for Castlehead High School, a secondary school in Paisley.

Landmarks 
William Wallace Monument and Wallace Yew
Elderslie Kirk; Elderslie was once divided between two parishes of the established Church of Scotland, Elderslie West and Elderslie East, which amalgamated around 1977.  Worshippers now meet in the former West church, renamed Elderslie Kirk.
Old Patrick Water; The stream which runs through the village, colloquially known as the Brandy Burn 
There is a golf club called Elderslie Golf Club and a bowling club.
Alleged home of William Wallace

Notable people
William Wallace (died 1305) – Scottish warrior
Wilhelmina Alexander (1756–1843) - Robert Burns' Bonnie Lass o'Ballochmyle.
Margaret McCoubrey (1880–1955) – Irish suffragist and active participant of the co-operative movement.
George Campbell Hay (1915–1984) – Writer
Dougie Vipond (1966–present) – television presenter and drummer of Deacon Blue.
Peter Nardone (1965–present) – musician
Richard Madden (1986–present) – actor
Callum Hawkins (1992–present) – Scottish record holder in the marathon and the British all-time number three.

See also
 Elderslie railway station
William Wallace
Renfrewshire

References

External links

Wallace Primary School

Villages in Renfrewshire
Johnstone